Naveen Malik is an Indian freestyle wrestler. He participated in the 2022 Commonwealth Games, winning the gold medal in the men's freestyle 74 kg. He defeated Muhammad Sharif Tahir of Pakistan in the finals with score 9-0.

He competed in the 70kg event at the 2022 World Wrestling Championships held in Belgrade, Serbia.

References 

2002 births
Living people
Commonwealth Games gold medallists for India
Commonwealth Games medallists in wrestling
Wrestlers at the 2022 Commonwealth Games
21st-century Indian people
Asian Wrestling Championships medalists
Medallists at the 2022 Commonwealth Games